The tenth season of the American animated television series SpongeBob SquarePants, created by marine biologist and animator Stephen Hillenburg, aired on Nickelodeon in the United States from October 15, 2016, to December 2, 2017. The series chronicles the exploits and adventures of the title character and his various friends in the fictional underwater city of Bikini Bottom. This season, which opened with "Whirly Brains" and finished airing with "The Incredible Shrinking Sponge", is the shortest in the show's history, containing 11 half-hours only instead of the usual length of 26.

The season was first announced on May 21, 2012. It was executive produced by Hillenburg, and was the first season of the show not to involve long-time crew member and former showrunner Paul Tibbitt. The showrunners for this season were Marc Ceccarelli and Vincent Waller, who also acted as supervising producers. 

The show received several accolades during the run of its tenth season, including the 2017 Kids' Choice Award for Favorite Cartoon. The series was also nominated in various international versions of the Kids' Choice for the same category. Similarly, the show was nominated for a BAFTA Children's Award (Kids' Vote for Television), which it lost to The Next Step. The SpongeBob SquarePants: The Complete Tenth Season DVD was released in region 1 on October 15, 2019, and region 4 on October 7, 2020.

Production
The season aired on Nickelodeon, which is owned by Viacom, and was produced by United Plankton Pictures and Nickelodeon Animation Studio. The season's only executive producer was series creator Stephen Hillenburg, who was announced to have returned to the series in January 2015. This is the first season since the fifth that former showrunner and long-time crew member Paul Tibbitt did not work on as an executive producer, and the first in the show's history without Tibbitt's involvement. The season is also the first to be run completely by Waller and Marc Ceccarelli, who had replaced Tibbitt as showrunners during the ninth season. Prior to this, Waller served as the creative director and an occasional writer and storyboard director of the series, while Ceccarelli served as a staff writer and storyboard director (and eventually, the series' animatic director). Ben Gruber, the co-creator of Adult Swim's Superjail!, joined the team of writers for this season.

In September 2013, it was reported that the tenth season was in production and expected to air in 2014; however, season nine was elongated into and past that year, due to production of The SpongeBob Movie: Sponge Out of Water. 

During production of the season, Hillenburg disclosed that he was diagnosed with amyotrophic lateral sclerosis, a terminal illness that affects and causes the death of neurons that control the brain and the spinal cord. He released a statement to the Variety magazine after his diagnosis, in which he affirmed that he would continue to work on SpongeBob SquarePants "for as long as [he is] able." He stated further, "My family and I are grateful for the outpouring of love and support. We ask that our sincere request for privacy be honored during this time." At the time, Hillenburg was in the early stages of the disease, according to a source close to him. He later died of the illness on November 26, 2018, during production of the series' twelfth season.

Cast
The tenth season features Tom Kenny as the voice of the title character SpongeBob SquarePants and his pet snail Gary. Kenny also played a number of incidental roles, including Prickles the worm, a guest character who has a major role in "House Worming". SpongeBob's greedy and money-obsessed employer at the Krusty Krab, Mr. Krabs, is voiced by Clancy Brown. Rodger Bumpass played the voice of Squidward Tentacles, an arrogant and ill-tempered octopus, while SpongeBob's best friend Patrick Star is voiced by Bill Fagerbakke. Other members of the cast are Mr. Lawrence as Plankton, Mr. Krabs' business rival; Jill Talley as Karen, Plankton's sentient computer sidekick; Carolyn Lawrence as Sandy Cheeks, a squirrel from Texas; Mary Jo Catlett as Mrs. Puff, SpongeBob's boating school teacher; and Lori Alan as Pearl, a teenage whale who is Mr. Krabs' daughter.

In addition to the regular cast members, episodes feature guest voices from many ranges of professions, including actors, musicians, and artists. For instance, former Screen Actors Guild president Ed Asner voiced the grumpy old fish in "Whirly Brains". J. K. Simmons voiced Maestro Mackerel, a conductor with a short temper, in "Snooze You Lose". Mackerel is a nod to the abusive music instructor Terence Fletcher in the 2014 film Whiplash, a role for which Simmons won the Academy Award for Best Supporting Actor. Seinfeld actor John O'Hurley, who had previously voiced King Neptune in season 1's "Neptune's Spatula" and season 6's "The Clash of Triton", reprised his role for "Trident Trouble". Steve Buscemi and Joe Pantoliano guest star in "The Getaway" as two crooks. This is the first season not to feature guest appearances from Ernest Borgnine and Tim Conway as the superheroes Mermaid Man and Barnacle Boy; Borgnine died during production of the previous season, so their characters were retired and limited to non-speaking cameo appearances for later season 9 episodes and onwards.

Reception
The season has received generally positive reviews from media critics. During the run of the tenth season, SpongeBob SquarePants received several awards and nominations. At the 2017 Kids' Choice Awards, the program won its fourteenth award for Favorite Cartoon. The program also received a pending nomination at the British Academy Children's Awards for the International category, which it lost.

Episodes

The tenth season of SpongeBob SquarePants consists of 11 episodes (22 segments, 1 short), which are ordered below according to Nickelodeon's packaging order, and not their original production or broadcast order. It is the shortest season, lacking the usual 26-episode length.

DVD release 
The DVD boxset for season ten was released by Paramount Home Entertainment and Nickelodeon in the United States and Canada on October 15, 2019. This is the only DVD set so far to not include any bonus features.

Notes

References

External links
Season 10 at Metacritic

2016 American television seasons
2017 American television seasons
SpongeBob SquarePants seasons